Asia Pacific School on Internet Governance  is a regional School of Internet Governance working towards raising awareness and capacity building within the Asia Pacific region. It's a yearly event that brings in Internet Leaders from the Asia Pacific region for a Training of Trainers  (TOT) program.
The APSIG is the Brain Child of Prof Dr. Kilnam Chon who is one of the Internet Hall of Fame inductees.

APSIG Annual Event 
APSIG 2018, Asian Institute of Technology Bangkok 08 to 12 Jul 2018
APSIG 2017,  Sukosol Hotel, Bangkok, 22 to 26 July 2017
APSIG 2016, Asian Institute of Technology Bangkok 11 to 15 Sep 2016

APSIG AMAZON Fellowship 
It was initially created for active participation in IGF. Later this program was renamed to APSIG Conference Fellowships.

References

External links
 APSIG 2016 and its inception
 Internet awareness and importance of School of Internet governance

Internet governance organizations
Internet Standards
Organizations established in 2016